Lushan County is a county in Pingdingshan, in southwest-central Henan Province, China, with a population of 830,000. This county is known for housing the Spring Temple Buddha, a giant statue of Buddha.

As 2012, this county is divided to 4 subdistricts, 5 towns and 15 townships.
Subdistricts

Towns

Townships

Climate

References

External links

County-level divisions of Henan
Pingdingshan